Panama is divided into ten provinces and four provincial-level indigenous regions (Spanish: comarcas indígenas, often shortened to comarcas).

There are also two indigenous regions within provinces that are considered equivalent to a corregimiento (municipality).

Provinces

Indigenous regions (comarcas indígenas)

Provincial level

Corregimiento-level

See also 
 ISO 3166-2:PA
 List of provinces and indigenous regions of Panama by Human Development Index

References 

 
Subdivisions of Panama
Panama, Provinces
Panama 1
Provinces, Panama
Panama geography-related lists